Bolagarh is a tehsil in Khordha in the Indian state of Odisha. It is the headquarter of Bolagarh Tehsil. It can be classified as a main-road area as National Highway 224 (New NH 57) passes through it.

Geography
Bolagarh is a village located in the Khordha district of Odisha state, India.

Language
Most people in Bolargarh speak Odia.

Weather and climate
Bolagarh's highest daytime temperature in the summer is between 30 °C to 42 °C . The average temperatures of January is 21 °C, February is 24 °C, March is 29 °C, April is 31 °C, May is 32 °C .

Places of note
 Ghanashyam-Pindika museum

Education
Education facilities in the town include:
Paramanda College
Baman High School
Govt Girls High School
sagarguan nodal high school
There are also some private schools:
Saraswati Shisu Mandir
Vivekananda Shikhya Kendra
Sai Sahara International School

Transport

See also
 Nayagarh
 Khordha
 Atri (hot spring)
 Maa Barunei Temple

References

Cities and towns in Khordha district